Cawishana (Kawishana, Kaishana) is an Arawakan language, presumably extinct, of Brazil. A few speakers were reported in the 1950s, and today only one person can speak it. 

Aikhenvald (1999) classifies it as a Middle Rio Negro, North Amazonian language, along with Shiriana and Manao. Kaufman (1994) had placed it in a branch of Western Nawiki Upper Amazonian along with two long-extinct languages, Jumana (Yumana) and Pasé, which Aikhenvald leaves unclassified. It had an active–stative syntax.

References

Languages of Brazil
Arawakan languages
Extinct languages of South America